John Anthony Conteh,  (born 27 May 1951) is a British former professional boxer who competed from 1971 to 1980. He held the WBC light-heavyweight title from 1974 to 1978, and regionally the European, British and Commonwealth titles between 1973 and 1974. As an amateur, he represented England and won a gold medal in the middleweight division at the 1970 British Commonwealth Games. In 2017, Conteh was awarded an MBE for services to boxing at the Queen's Birthday Honours.

Professional career
Born in Liverpool, Lancashire (now Merseyside) to an Irish mother and Sierra Leonean             father, Conteh began boxing at the age of 10 at a boxing club in Kirkby that was a training ground for fellow British amateur Joey Singleton. At 19, he won the middleweight gold medal at the 1970 British Commonwealth Games. He won the WBC light-heavyweight title in October 1974 by defeating Jorge Ahumada. He held the title until 1977 when he was stripped for not going through with a mandated defence.

Conteh lost a 15-round split decision to the Yugoslavian fighter Mate Parlov when he attempted to regain the title. He failed twice in further efforts to win back the crown, in 1979 and then again seven months later in 1980, on both occasions fighting the American Matthew Saad Muhammad. Muhammad won both bouts but the first victory was declared void because his cornermen used an illegal substance on a cut.

Appearances outside boxing
Conteh was one of the celebrities featured dressed in prison gear on the cover of the 1973 Wings album, Band on the Run. He was the subject of This Is Your Life in 1974.

Conteh was the British Superstars competition champion in 1974, the second year of the televised sporting event. Conteh is now an after-dinner speaker and speaks at venues all across the country.

Conteh appeared on the BBC television programme Sporting Legends which was presented by Eamonn Holmes. There he spoke at length at how he started out in boxing and how Ali persuaded him to fight at light-heavyweight instead of heavyweight. Ali believed that Conteh was too small to be a heavyweight. Conteh also spoke of how his lifestyle led to alcoholism and a charge of assault, he stated that at the time he appeared on Sporting Legends he had been dry for nine years.

Conteh also appeared in films such as Man at the Top (1973), The Stud (1978) and Tank Malling (1989), and made a starring appearance in the television show Boon in 1989, as a washed-up boxer. He more recently appeared on a boxing special of The Weakest Link in 2009, where he finished in third place. His most recent TV acting appearance was in the crime drama Justice, in which he again played an ex-boxer.

Conteh was appointed Member of the Order of the British Empire (MBE) in the 2017 Birthday Honours for services to boxing.

Professional boxing record

References

External links

|- 

1951 births
Living people
English male boxers
English people of Irish descent
English sportspeople of Sierra Leonean descent
People from Kirkby
Black British sportspeople
Boxers at the 1970 British Commonwealth Games
Commonwealth Games gold medallists for England
Boxers from Liverpool
England Boxing champions
Commonwealth Games medallists in boxing
Commonwealth Boxing Council champions
European Boxing Union champions
World Boxing Council champions
World light-heavyweight boxing champions
Middleweight boxers
Members of the Order of the British Empire
British Boxing Board of Control champions
Medallists at the 1970 British Commonwealth Games